Parsenn is a ski area near Davos, Switzerland, offering 35 ski runs.

The Parsenn area is the largest and most modern of Davos' five mountains. 

The recently updated Parsenn "red railway" funicular covers the difference of  up to the Weissfluhjoch ridge. One can also get from Klosters to Gotschna/Parsenn with a large cable car which runs from here run up to  into the Prättigau valley. 

Geography of Switzerland
Ski areas and resorts in Switzerland
Buildings and structures in Graubünden
Tourist attractions in Graubünden
Sport in Davos